Hippotion rosetta, or Swinhoe's striated hawkmoth, is a sphingid moth of the family Sphingidae. The species was first described by Charles Swinhoe in 1892.

Distribution 
It is found from southern Pakistan, India, the Maldives and Sri Lanka, east across Thailand, southern China and Taiwan to southern Japan (the Ryukyu Archipelago) and the Philippines, then south across south-east Asia to the Andaman Islands, eastern Indonesia, the Solomon Islands and the Torres Strait of New Guinea.

Description

Biology 
There are several generations per year in Hong Kong, with adults on wing from March to November, with peaks in late March, May and early October.

Larvae have been recorded on Borreria, Morinda citrifolia and Morinda umbellata, as well as Pentas lanceolata.

References

 Pinhey, E. (1962). Hawk Moths of Central and Southern Africa. Longmans Southern Africa, Cape Town.

External links

Hippotion
Moths described in 1892
Moths of Japan